Damad Mahmud Celâleddin Pasha (Gaddar)or Mahmut Celaleddin Âsaf  (Gaddar) (b. Istanbul 1853 - d. Brussels 1903) was an Ottoman statesman, poet and writer.

Biography 
His father was the Ottoman naval officer Damat Gürcü Halil Rifat Pasha and his mother was İsmet Hanım. He lost his father at a young age and after special education and two years in the Paris embassy, improved himself and learned French. His first marriage was with İffet Hanım. On December 28, 1876, during the reign of Sultan Abdülaziz, he was married to Seniha Sultan the daughter of the Ottoman Sultan Abdulmecid, and became a groom to the Ottoman Dynasty.  His son Prens Sabahattin and Lütfullah Bey were born from this marriage. He died on 17 December 1903 in Brussels.

In popular culture 
Between 2017 and 2021, he was played by actor Hakan Boyav in TRT's Payitaht: Abdülhamid series.

References 

Georgians from the Ottoman Empire
Committee of Union and Progress politicians
1853 births
1903 deaths